is a Japanese politician of the Liberal Democratic Party, a member of the House of Councillors in the Diet (national legislature). A native of Tanabe, Wakayama, he graduated from Ashiya University and Western Australia Institute of Technology. Since 1979 he had served in the assembly of Wakayama Prefecture for six terms. After running unsuccessfully for governorship of Wakayama Prefecture in 2000, he was elected to the House of Councillors for the first time in 2001. In May 2010, he joined the Happiness Realization Party, giving that group its first national political representative. He left the party six months later, and is currently a member of the Liberal Democratic Party.

Right-wing positions
He was a supporter of right-wing filmmaker Satoru Mizushima's 2007 revisionist film The Truth about Nanjing, which denied that the Nanking Massacre ever occurred.

References 

Members of the House of Councillors (Japan)
Living people
1945 births
Democratic Party of Japan politicians
Happiness Realization Party politicians
Liberal Democratic Party (Japan) politicians
People from Tanabe, Wakayama
Nanjing Massacre deniers
Ashiya University alumni